White Hand or Whitehand may refer to:

Organizations
 Mano Blanca ('White Hand'), a Guatemalan anti-communist death squad 1966–1978
 White Hand (Serbia), a secret military organization in the early 1900s
 White Hand Gang, anti-Italian Irish gangs in New York in the early 1900s
 White Hand Campaign, an campaign for a worldwide legal ban of child corporal punishment

People
 Humbert I, Count of Savoy (c. 980 – c. 1042), known as Humbert the White-Handed 
 William of the White Hands (1135–1202), a French cardinal

Other uses
 White hand sign, a medical sign observed as a visible whitening of skin on the hand
 White Hands Campaign, an initiative promoting women's rights in the Arabic world
 White Hands (film), a 1922 American film directed by Lambert Hillyer
 Gilbert Whitehand, a member of Robin Hood's Merry Men
 Hands (advertisement), sometimes known as "White Hands", a controversial 1990 American political advertisement

See also

 Hand (disambiguation)
 Gareth, a Knight of the Round Table, nicknamed "Beaumains", sometimes translated as "Fair Hands"